The Lock the Gate Alliance is an incorporated Australian community action group which was formed in 2010 in response to the expansion of the coal mining and coal seam gas industries, which were encroaching on agricultural land, rural communities and environmentally sensitive areas. The organisation has initially focused on responding to developments in the states of Queensland and New South Wales, through peaceful protest and noncooperation. Lock the Gate Alliance's stated mission is "to protect Australia’s natural, environmental, cultural and agricultural resources from inappropriate mining and to educate and empower all Australians to demand sustainable solutions to food and energy production." The Alliance claims to have over 40,000 members and 250 local groups constitute the alliance including farmers, traditional custodians, conservationists and urban residents. The organisation was incorporated in 2011 in New South Wales and became a registered company, limited by guarantee on 6 March 2012. The inaugural AGM was held in Murwillumbah on 11 June 2011 at which Drew Hutton was elected president. Another notable member is Dayne Pratzky, whose activism became the subject of the 2015 documentary film, Frackman.

On 21 June 2017, Drew Hutton announced his resignation as the president of the Lock the Gate Alliance via Facebook. In the post Hutton noted that he "made this decision with great sadness but I have serious, chronic health issues that simply won't allow me to do what is needed in such a position". Hundreds of tributes to his work and dedication followed this announcement.

Lock the Gate's supporter base includes notable individuals from across the political spectrum, including former Greens party leader Bob Brown and conservative 2GB radio personality, Alan Jones. Despite the diverse political backgrounds and regional distribution of its member base, the Lock the Gate Alliance's opponents have labelled them a "green" group and suggested that their membership is urban and anti-development. In 2015 an editorial in Queensland's Courier Mail said of the group: "The mindless demonisation of industries that offer the chance to ensure the continuing prosperity of Queensland – and therefore Queenslanders – does nobody any favours." The organisation features in the media regularly and lobbies government for stronger protections for productive agricultural land, groundwater resources and catchment areas.

The alliance supported campaigners in Bentley (NSW), Broome (WA), Gloucester (NSW), Seaspray (VIC), Maules Creek (NSW), Borroloola (NT), Narribri (NSW) and Tara (QLD).

Funding 
The Lock the Gate Alliance had an operational budget of $2.8 Million in 2021. It is funded by grants, donations and receives in-kind support. Lock the Gate received approximately $415,000 of Australian Government JobKeeper subsidies over 2020 and 2021. 

Notable donors include Kjerulf Ainsworth, who during the two years prior to October 2012 contributed approximately $200,000 towards fund legal, travel and other expenses for Drew Hutton, to screen the documentary film Gasland in over 80 country towns and to fund activist Dayne Pratzky. Another notable donor is the American-based political body “Tides foundation” who declared funding of $160,000 in 2013 and $275,000 in 2012 to Lock the Gate. According to forms lodged to the Australian Charities and Not-for-profits Commission (ACNC), a large proportion of Lock the Gate’s funding has come from undisclosed sources. For instance, in 2015 Lock the Gate received $823,000 from an undisclosed source. In 2016 Lock the Gate received $2.1 million from undisclosed grants and donations. Membership subscriptions accounts for 0.2% of their income.

The Lock the Gate Alliance is listed on the Australian Government's Register of Environmental Organisations which provides them with a range of tax concessions, including the ability to receive tax-deductible gifts and contributions. This has attracted criticism from industry groups and (particularly) Senator Canavan. They claim this deduction should not be available to “aggressive activist groups”.  The mining industry in particular have claimed that Lock the Gate are collecting tax breaks and should be stripped of their charity donation status. Legal experts from the Adelaide University Law School, however, warned that any move to narrow the definition of what constitutes an "environmental organisation" – and strip them of their charitable status as a result - would represent an "attack on Australian democracy".

Documentary films 
The Lock the Gate Alliance regularly publishes videos via YouTube. It has produced two documentary films and has featured prominently in another. The organisation uses video to inform viewers of the implications of expanding gas and mining activities in sensitive areas, document and broadcast their activities, celebrate their achievements and to draw attention to their organisation and cause.

Undermining Australia (2013) 
Undermining Australia - Coal vs. Communities (2013) was written directed and edited by David Lowe. Some of the interviews were conducted by Richard Todd, who also contributed footage to the film while working on the feature documentary, Frackman.

Fractured Country (2013) 
Fractured Country - An unconventional invasion (2013) was directed, shot and edited by Brendan Shoebridge. It was narrated by actor Jack Thompson, and featured footage from many sources, including Richard Todd, Dayne Pratzky and documentary filmmaker David Bradbury.

Frackman (2015) 

Drew Hutton, Dayne Pratzky and some of Lock the Gate's events and demonstrations feature in the 2015 documentary film Frackman. The film was directed by Richard Todd and Jonathan Stack and produced by production company, Smith & Nasht.

References

External links 

 Drew Hutton and Adrian Skerritt: Our radical past: protest in 60s and 70s Brisbane oral history, State Library of Queensland
 Coal Seam Gas photographs, State Library of Queensland. Includes photographs of Lock the Gate Alliance opposing coal gas seam in Dalby and Tara

Coal in Australia
Community activists
Australian activists
Environmental organisations based in Australia